Savonlinna sub-region  is a subdivision of Southern Savonia and one of the Sub-regions of Finland since 2009.

Sub-regions of Finland
Geography of South Savo